Amol Gole is an Indian cinematographer who shot Hindi films like Stanley Ka Dabba, Hawaa Hawaai, Elizabeth Ekadashi, Touring Talkies, Investment etc. He debuted as an Independent cinematographer with the film Stanley Ka Dabba directed by Amol Gupte. As cinematographer Amol used a still DSLR camera, Canon's 7D, to make sure the kids (who were shot without missing school, only on Saturdays and during vacation-time) could be themselves, free and feckless and open to constant improvisation. The results are striking, a film that feels both stunningly real and yet beautifully textured, color-corrected immaculately enough to look markedly un-digital on the big screen. Besides feature films, he has also shot many ad films, documentaries and short films.

Gole has also shot the internationally acclaimed documentary -- 'Nero's Guests' based on Journalist Palagummi Sainath's work in Vidarbha on issues related to the agrarian crisis.

Marathi film 'Gajaar' has become the first film in the history of Marathi Cinema to be shot entirely using a digital camera. The film, which has been shot live on the annual pilgrimage of Saint Dnyaneshwar from Alandi in Pune to Pandharpur in Solapur, has been shot on a Canon 7D, a digital SLR camera.

Personal life
Amol is studied from Sir J. J. School of Commercial Arts, Mumbai. He is married to Swati Shinde Gole. She is a senior journalist and worked with Times of India as Special Correspondent. Amol and Swati have a son.

Filmography
As Director

Nashibvaan ( film ) (2019)

Sumi (2020 film) Best Child National Award (2021)

As Producer
Rangaa Patangaa (2016)

As Cinematographer
Rangaa Patangaa (Released 1 April 2016) 
 Stanley Ka Dabba (2011)
 Hawa Hawai (2014)
 Elizabeth Ekadashi (2014)

 The Bright Day (2015)
 Whisky Is Risky (2014)
 Mokssh (2013)
 Investment (2013)
 Ha Bharat Maza (2012)
 Gajaar: Journey of the Soul (2012)
 Nero's Guests (Documentary) (2012)
 Nashibvaan ( film ) (2019)
 Ashi Hi Aashiqui ( film ) (2019)
 Touring Talkies

Awards
 Sant Tukaram " Best International Marathi Film Award for the Rangaa Patangaa at PIFF - Pune International Film Festival, 2016
 Best Cinematographer' for Elizabeth Ekadashi at PIFF - Pune International Film Festival, 2015
 Best rural film at Maharashtra state film awards 2016.

References

External links
 
 
 
 14th Pune International Film Festival
 Amol Gole on his film Rangaa Patangaa
 Amol Gole's Official Facebook Page
 Rangaa Patangaa Official Movie Page

1979 births
Living people
Marathi people
Cinematographers from Maharashtra
Marathi film cinematographers
Artists from Pune
Film producers from Mumbai
Artists from Mumbai